The men's 4x100 metres relay event at the 2004 World Junior Championships in Athletics was held in Grosseto, Italy, at Stadio Olimpico Carlo Zecchini on 17 and 18 July.

Medalists

Results

Final
18 July

Heats
17 July

Heat 1

Heat 2

Heat 3

Participation
According to an unofficial count, 77 athletes from 19 countries participated in the event.

References

4 x 100 metres relay
Relays at the World Athletics U20 Championships